The Green Line is a light rail transit line in the Sacramento Regional Transit District (RT) light rail system. It opened on June 15, 2012, and runs between 13th Street station and 7th and Richards/Township 9 station. The Green Line runs through north downtown to Township 9 in the River District, and is projected eventually to reach Sacramento International Airport. The line only operates on weekdays.

History
In the 1990s, Sacramento RT started identifying corridors for new light rail extensions and selected an alignment for a new line that would reach the Sacramento Airport from Sacramento via Natomas. Formal planning for the line began in the early 2000s. Construction for the initial segment of the Green Line that runs to the River District began in late 2009 after finalizing environmental review in early 2009. The initial line opened for service on June 15, 2012, with a single new station at Township 9.

In 2016, low ridership on the Green Line and the lack of development at Township 9 led the Sacramento RT Board to consider closing the line in 2017.

Line description
The Green Line begins at its current northern terminus at the 7th and Richards / Township 9 station in the River District.  From there it initially travels south on 7th Street on a single-track.  Reaching downtown, the Green Line goes to two tracks at G Street as one-way tracks for 7th and 8th Streets where it joins the Blue and Gold Lines.  It then turns westward on O Street, southward on 12th, then eastward in an alley paralleling Q and R Streets, before reaching its southern terminus at 13th Street station.

Station listing 
The following table lists the current stations of the Green Line, from north to south.

Future extension
The Green Line to Sacramento International Airport (SMF) light rail future extension Project will extend service  to Sacramento International Airport. The agency is currently completing environmental documents for the project. This project is planned to start construction by 2022. As of May 2019, future new Green Line stations, South to Northwest from the existing 7th & Richards/Township 9 Station, are:

Sequoia Pacific Station (Optional)
West El Camino Station
Pebblestone Way Station
San Juan Station
Gateway Park Station
Arena Blvd. Station
(Unnamed station)
East Town Center Station
North Natomas Town Center Station
Commerce Parkway Station (Optional)
Club Center Drive Station
Greenbriar Station (Optional)
Metro Air Park Station (Optional)
Sacramento International Airport -SMF- Station

References

External links

Sacramento Regional Transit District
Transportation in Sacramento, California
Public transportation in Sacramento County, California
Passenger rail transportation in California
Light rail in California
Railway lines opened in 2012
2012 establishments in California